Simmineh District is in Bukan County, West Azerbaijan province, Iran. At the 2006 National Census, its population was 25,401 in 4,788 households. The following census in 2011 counted 24,982 people in 5,921 households. At the latest census in 2016, the district had 26,672 inhabitants in 8,149 households.

References 

Bukan County

Districts of West Azerbaijan Province

Populated places in West Azerbaijan Province

Populated places in Bukan County